The Hotan River (also known as the Khotan River or the Ho-t'ien River) is formed by the union of the White Jade (Yurungkash) and Karakash (Black Jade) Rivers, which flow north from the Kunlun Mountains into the Taklamakan Desert in northern China. The river then flows  northwards across the desert and empties itself into the Tarim River. Because the river is fed by melting snow from the mountains, it only carries water during the summer and is dry the rest of the year. Prior to construction of the Tarim Desert Highway in 1995, the Hotan river bed provided the only transportation system across the Tarim Basin.

Wells
In the mid-20th century, wells along the course of the river included (south to north): Hsüeh-erh-ch'i-k'o-ma, Chi-la-mu-yeh-te-tao, Ai-k'o-t'i-ken, Ch'i-erh-ko-han-t'u-mu-shu-k'o, A-ya-k'o-wu-ssu-tan, Man-ta-t'u-mu-shu-k'o, Lo-tsa-pai-t'u-mu-shu-k'o, Yeh-ma-la-k'o-tao, Po-lo-ch'u-shih-kan, Hsi-t'i-pa-ku-t'an and Ya-erh-te-ku-tzu.

References

Notes

Rivers of Xinjiang
Sites along the Silk Road
Hotan